Peter Becker (born 9 June 1949 in Otago, New Zealand) is a New Zealand curler and curling coach.

At the international level, he is a two-time bronze medallist of Pacific Curling Championships.

At he national level, he is a three-time New Zealand men's champion curler (1999, 2000, 2013) and 2013 New Zealand senior men's champion curler.

In 2022 he was inducted into the World Curling Hall of Fame.

Teams and events

Men's

Mixed doubles

Record as a coach of national teams

Personal life
Becker's family is well known as a curling family in New Zealand. Peter's wife, two sons, daughter and father have all represented New Zealand on an international scale. His father William Becker was one of the first men who began curling in New Zealand. Peter's older son, Sean, is one of most successful and well known New Zealand curlers. Younger son, Scott, is competitive curler too, he was skip of New Zealand men's team on 2018 Pacific-Asia Curling Championships. Daughter, Bridget Becker has been the skip of the New Zealand women's national curling team, silver medallist of 2010 World Mixed Doubles Curling Championship, silver and bronze medallist of Pacific-Asia Championships.

References

External links

Living people
1949 births
People from Otago
New Zealand male curlers
New Zealand curling champions
New Zealand curling coaches
20th-century New Zealand people
21st-century New Zealand people